Robert Eddy (born 7 January 1988) is an Australian rules footballer, currently playing for Woodville-West Torrens Football Club in the South Australian National Football League.

Overview
Eddy grew up in Gippsland, Victoria and attended Caulfield Grammar School in Melbourne.

He was an elite ball winner at junior level, averaging 27 disposals per game for Gippsland during the 2006 TAC Cup season.

AFL career

St Kilda Football Club

2006: Drafted
Eddy was drafted by St Kilda with the 39th pick in the 2007 AFL Rookie Draft, and was on the rookie list until 2008.

2008: Debut
Eddy was elevated off the rookie list to play 13 games in 2008. He made his debut in Round 13 and kept his spot in the side for the rest of the season, including 3 finals appearances. He won 12 disposals per game for St Kilda in 2008, but it was his defensive pressure that impressed as he laid the third most tackles of any player during his time in the side.

The midfielder/forward is noted for his endurance, willingness to go hard at the ball and ability to apply forward pressure.

2009: Minor premiership
Eddy played 10 games in the 2009 season, with St Kilda qualifying in first position for the finals series, winning the club's third minor premiership.

Eddy played in St Kilda's two finals victories in 2009 but was dropped for the grand final for Sean Dempster.

2010: Grand finalist, delisting and redrafting

Eddy played in the 2010 AFL Grand Final in which St Kilda drew with Collingwood and the 2010 AFL Grand Final Replay in which St Kilda were defeated by 56 points. He was delisted by the club at the end of the 2010 premiership season and then redrafted onto the club's rookie list in the 2011 Rookie Draft.

2012: SANFL
Eddy joined Woodville-West Torrens in late 2011, signing a two-year contract.

See also
 List of Caulfield Grammar School people

References

External links

1988 births
Living people
St Kilda Football Club players
People educated at Caulfield Grammar School
Australian rules footballers from Victoria (Australia)
Gippsland Power players
Woodville-West Torrens Football Club players
Sandringham Football Club players